Höllentour (literally meaning "Hell Tour") is a 2004 German film. The US release (with English subtitles) was titled Hell on Wheels. The film is a record of the 100th anniversary Tour de France in 2003 from the perspective of Germany's Team Telekom, focusing on riders Erik Zabel and Rolf Aldag. The film is directed by  who won an Academy Award for Live Action Short Film in 1993 for Black Rider (Schwarzfahrer).

In 2004, Mona Bräuer won a German Film Critics Award for Best Editing (Bester Schnitt).

Subsequent to the making of the documentary, several of the Telekom cyclists involved, including Zabel and Aldag, either confessed to illegal doping to enhance performance or were caught doing so, which drew more interest to the film.

References

External links 
 

2004 films
2004 documentary films
Documentary films about cycling
German documentary films
2000s German-language films
2000s German films
2003 Tour de France
Tour de France mass media